Yvette Rees (22 May 1924 Swansea, Wales – 1993 in Ealing, London) Born ‘Eiros Yvette Rees’, was a Welsh actress who appeared in many TV series and several noteworthy films in the 1960s. She trained at RADA, and graduated in 1949. In the mid-1970s she moved to Australia where she continued to work on TV and film until 1979 when she appears to have retired. She is perhaps best remembered for her memorable role in 1964's Witchcraft as the witch Vanessa Whitlock who returns from the grave to avenge being buried alive several hundred years previously.
Yvette is also the grandmother of stuntman Ben Smith-Petersen. Through her son Simon, who also worked in TV and cinema. She was married to Morten Smith-Petersen.

Films and TV
1960: The Days of Vengeance (TV Series) – Mrs. Collins
1960: Here Lies Miss Sabry (TV Series) – Janet
1962: Out of This World (TV Series) – Mrs. Chalmers
1960-1962: Dixon of Dock Green (TV Series) – Carol Small / Lil
1963: Suspense (TV Series) – The Relief Nurse
1964: Witchcraft – Vanessa Whitlock
1964: Z Cars (TV Series) – Mrs. McLean
1964: Catch Hand (TV Series) – Elvira Peters
1964: The Likely Lads (TV Series) – Freda Windsor
1964: Troubled Waters – Sally Driscoll
1965: Monitor (TV Series documentary) – Stage Madame Bardac
1965: Curse of the Fly – Wan
1965: 199 Park Lane (TV Series) – Alex Kovacs
1965: The Wednesday Play (TV Series)
1970: Julius Caesar – Plebeian #4
1970: Paul Temple (TV Series) – Gibbs
1970: A Severed Head – Woman at Party #2
1971: The Trojan Women – Woman #33
1971: The Troubleshooters (TV Series) – Dr. Eve Gorman
1973: Cheri (TV Movie) – Constance
1979: Prisoner (TV Series) – Marjorie Whitton
1979: Thirst – Nurse (final film role)

References

External links

Yvette Rees at Aveleyman.com.

1924 births
1993 deaths
Welsh film actresses
Welsh television actresses
Welsh emigrants to Australia
Alumni of RADA